Smelter Mountain is part of the La Plata Mountains range which is a subset of the Rocky Mountains of North America. Precipitation runoff from Smelter Mountain drains into tributaries of the Animas River. A 1.2 mile hiking trail leads to the summit, and other recreational activities include hunting and paragliding.

References

External links
 Weather forecast: Smelter Mountain

Mountains of La Plata County, Colorado
San Juan Mountains (Colorado)
Mountains of Colorado
North American 2000 m summits